Lai Min ( 160s – 260s), courtesy name Jingda, was an official and scholar of the state of Shu Han during the Three Kingdoms period of China.

Life
Lai Min was from Xinye County, Yiyang Commandery, which is present-day Xinye County, Henan. He was born sometime in the 160s during the Eastern Han dynasty. His ancestor was Lai Xi (來歙; died 35 CE), an official who served under Emperor Guangwu ( 25–57 CE), the first Eastern Han emperor. His father, Lai Yan, was known for being studious and hospitable towards retainers. Lai Yan served as a government official and rose to the position of Minister of Works during the reign of Emperor Ling ( 168–189).

When chaos broke out towards the end of the Eastern Han dynasty, Lai Min and his elder sister fled south to Jing Province (covering present-day Hubei and Hunan) to evade trouble. Lai Min's elder sister married Huang Wan, a nephew of the grandmother of Liu Zhang, the Governor of Yi Province (covering present-day Sichuan and Chongqing). When Liu Zhang heard that they were in Jing Province, he sent people to fetch them to Yi Province. Lai Min followed his sister and brother-in-law to Yi Province, where Liu Zhang treated him like a guest.

Lai Min was known for being well read, well-versed in the Zuo Zhuan, and for specialising in lexicographical works such as the Cangjiepian and Erya. In particular, he enjoyed studying ancient Chinese script styles. He frequently debated with Meng Guang, another guest scholar living in Yi Province, over the Spring and Autumn Annals (Chunqiu) as each of them preferred a different commentary on the Chunqiu: Lai Min and Meng Guang specialised in the Zuo Zhuan and Gongyang Zhuan respectively. Meng Guang was notorious for being loud and annoying during his debates with Lai Min.

In 214, after the warlord Liu Bei seized control of Yi Province from Liu Zhang, he recruited Lai Min to serve in the education office of his administration. During this time, Lai Min worked with a group of scholars on the codification of procedures and rituals. However, the project ended up dissolving into squabbles.

Following the end of the Eastern Han dynasty in 220, Lai Min served in the state of Shu Han, founded by Liu Bei in 221, during the Three Kingdoms period. Liu Bei appointed him as Household Steward to take care of Liu Shan, the Crown Prince. When Liu Bei died in 223, Liu Shan succeeded his father as the emperor of Shu. After his coronation, Liu Shan appointed Lai Min as a General of the Household in the Huben (虎賁; "Rapid as Tigers") division of the imperial guards.

Between 227 and 234, Zhuge Liang, the Imperial Chancellor of Shu, launched a series of military campaigns against Shu's rival state, Wei. Hanzhong Commandery served as the base for launching each campaign. During this time, Zhuge Liang summoned Lai Min to Hanzhong Commandery and appointed him as an Army Libationer and General Who Assists the Army to assist him in the campaigns. Lai Min was later stripped of his appointments for committing an offence. Zhuge Liang wrote in a memo why he decided to fire Lai Min: 

Following Zhuge Liang's death in 234, Lai Min returned to Chengdu, the Shu imperial capital, to serve as the Empress's Chamberlain. He was fired again later. After some time, he was recalled back to serve as a Household Counsellor, but was removed from office again shortly after. Throughout his career, he was demoted or fired several times, either because he had no filter when he spoke or because he behaved inappropriately.

At the time, Lai Min's old debating rival, Meng Guang, was as equally notorious for being unbridled in his speech and was, in some ways, worse than Lai Min in this regard. Meng Guang not only carelessly divulged state secrets (probably due to a slip of the tongue), but also discussed politics in an inappropriate setting. Nevertheless, both of them got off lightly because they held much prestige among the literati for their status as learned Confucian scholars. Lai Min, in particular, came from an elite family background and had previously served as an attendant to the Shu emperor Liu Shan when the emperor was still crown prince, therefore he was able to return to service every time after he got fired.

After Lai Min's string of incidents, the Shu government specially appointed him as General Who Behaves Cautiously. The name of his position was meant to remind him to be mindful of his speech and conduct. He died sometime between 258 and 263 at the age of 97 (by East Asian age reckoning).

Family
Lai Min's son, Lai Zhong, was known for being well-versed in Confucian studies and resembling his father in character. Lai Zhong and Xiang Chong once praised the Shu general Jiang Wei, who was so pleased that he recruited them to serve as Army Advisers under him.

See also
 Lists of people of the Three Kingdoms

Notes

References

 Chen, Shou (3rd century). Records of the Three Kingdoms (Sanguozhi).
 
 Pei, Songzhi (5th century). Annotations to Records of the Three Kingdoms (Sanguozhi zhu).
 Sima, Guang (1084). Zizhi Tongjian.

2nd-century births
3rd-century deaths
Shu Han politicians
Politicians from Nanyang, Henan
Officials under Liu Bei
Han dynasty politicians from Henan
Liu Zhang and associates